Kate Tsui Tsz-shan is a former Hong Kong actress, who is best known for her work with Television Broadcasts Limited (TVB),  her movies, and her singing career. She also holds the Miss Hong Kong 2004 title. In December 2019, she announced her retirement from the entertainment industry with plans of moving to Europe and furthering her education.

Early life
Kate was born and raised in Hong Kong.

Prior to winning her beauty queen title, Kate had originally aspired to become a professional dancer. She had begun practicing ballet since the age of 4 but was forced to quit when she was 11 due to an injury on her right ankle. At the age of 14, she had begun to practice Jazz dancing, Salsa, and Argentina Tango.

She graduated from the University of California, Davis, majoring in language. After completing her degree in the United States, she returned to Hong Kong and worked as a translator and project coordinator at an engineering firm.

In 2004, she entered the Miss Hong Kong beauty pageant and was crowned the winner along with the titles of Miss Photogenic, Miss International Goodwill, and the Slimming Beauty Award. After the pageant, she signed with TVB and began her career as an actress.

TV career
Following guest roles in The Zone and When Rules Turn Loose in 2005, Kate made her official TV debut in the TVB series, La Femme Desperado in 2006. Professional Taiwanese film critic, Mai Ruoyu, while critiquing Kate's film performance, had said that Tsui had demonstrated strong charisma and had effectively held her own in La Femme Desperado, even while starring alongside veteran actresses, Sheren Tang and Melissa Ng. Her role as Ida in the series was also nominated in the Best Supporting Actress category, as well as the Favourite Female Character category, in the TVB Anniversary Awards 2006.

In 2007, Kate participated in three TVB drama series, including The Brink of Law, On the First Beat, and Steps. The roles cumulatively earned her the Most Improved Female Artist award from the TVB Anniversary Awards 2007. Her role in Steps also earned her nominations in the Best Actress category, as well Favourite Female Character category for the same awards show.

In 2008, Kate took on her first role as a villain in Moonlight Resonance, and the role earned her a Top 5 position in the Best Supporting Actress category of the TVB Anniversary Awards 2008. On the other hand, her leading role in Speech of Silence, in which she played a deaf character, had earned her a Top 10 position in the Best Actress category of the aforementioned awards show.

While Kate's TV career quieted down from 2009 to 2010 due to her focus on her film career, 2011 was a fruitful year for her; with six of her TV dramas airing on TVB. Of the six roles, Paris Yiu from Lives of Omission garnered the most attention. Kate was awarded a My Favourite TVB Female TV Character award from the StarHub TVB Awards, nominations in the Best Actress and Favourite Female Character categories for the TVB Anniversary Awards 2011, as well as a nomination for Outstanding Actress in Television by the Ming Pao Anniversary Award.

Additionally, in 2011, with the high turnover rate in contracted TVB artists, TVB executive, Virginia Lok, appointed Tsui, Myolie Wu, Linda Chung, and Fala Chen, as the new Top 4 "Fa Dans" (a Cantonese term that is used for actresses with high popularity and status in TVB), with their predecessors being Flora Chan, Ada Choi, Kenix Kwok, and Jessica Hsuan.

In Highs and Lows (2012), Tsui portrayed an extremely tragic character that struggled with substance abuse, gang rape, and eventually, drug dealing. Kate described her experience of filming this drama as "being on an emotional roller coaster", to the extent that she did not wish to speak to anyone or pick up the phone after work. The producer of the drama, Lam Chi Wah, referred to Tsui's role in Highs and Lows as the greatest breakthrough in her career and applauded her for setting down her image as a beauty pageant winner to dive into such a complex character in the drama. Film director, Patrick Kong, also noted in his column that Tsui's acting had greatly matured in Highs and Lows, particularly in her portrayal of emotional scenes.

In 2014, Kate took part in the TVB-produced microfilm, A Time of Love, which consisted of four individual stories with an individual theme. Kate starred opposite Taiwanese actors, James Wen and Chris Wang, in the "sorrow" themed story. After the airing of the microfilm, TVB received 39 individual viewer statements that commended Tsui for her outstanding performance in the microfilm. Column writer, Ko Leung, of Macao Daily, also stated Tsui portrayed her character in the microfilm perfectly and that Tsui's acting is comparable to that of Bai Baihe in The Stolen Years.

In 2015, Kate's management contract with TVB ended. She is still on very good terms with TVB, and TVB has arranged numerous jobs for her up until February 2016. Despite having received several offers, Tsui stated that she will not finalize any management contract agreements until she has completed her jewelry design courses.

Film career
Aside from her acting career in television, Kate also experienced success in developing her career in the film industry. In 2007, through a series of auditions, Tsui was cast as the female lead, alongside A-list actors Tony Leung Ka-fai and Simon Yam, in Eye in the Sky, which is a film produced by Johnnie To and directed by Yau Nai-hoi. With her performance in Eye in the Sky, Tsui earned the Best Newcomer – Gold Award from Hong Kong Film Directors' Guild 2007, as well as Hong Kong Film Award for Best New Performer from the 27th Hong Kong Film Awards, held in 2008.

In 2009, Kate starred in I Corrupt All Cops, a Hong Kong crime drama, directed by Wong Jing, who was impressed with the success of her debut performance in Eye in the Sky. Eason Chan, who plays Tsui's husband in the film, said Tsui's character is based on Shuang'er from The Deer and the Cauldron.

In 2010, Kate starred in the Wuxia film, 14 Blades, alongside Donnie Yen, Zhao Wei, and Wu Chun.

In 2011, Kate reprised her role as Paris Yiu Ho Ho from the TVB series Lives of Omission in its film sequel, Turning Point 2, in which she starred opposite Francis Ng.  Playing a character with a mental disorder in the film, Kate said that collaborating with Ng was a valuable experience because Ng was extremely willing to teach and give her suggestions about her acting and performances. From working with Tsui, Ng had openly praised her for her acting potential.

In 2013, Kate took part in a comedy film, I Love Hong Kong 2013. It is also the first film that veteran actress, Veronica Yip, has taken part in since her retirement in 1996. In the film, Kate plays the younger version of Yip's character. The producer of the film, Eric Tsang, specifically praised Kate for providing the best performance out of the entire cast, referring to it as a "Best Actress performance". In the same year, Tsui was also cast in Giddens Ko film, A Choo, alongside Ariel Lin and Kai Ko.

In 2015, Kate was cast in the thriller film, Knock Knock, Who's There?. The film is the first directorial effort by veteran actress, Carrie Ng. Tsui said that upon receiving the script, she had intended to reject the role because of the frightening content. However, Tsui eventually agreed to the role due to Ng's persistence and persuasion. With reference to collaborating with Kate, Ng said that Tsui is a very professional and admirable actress.

Jewelry design career
In December 2015, Kate launched a fine jewelry line with K.S. Sze & Sons Ltd. Her debut collection, "Rabbit-Duck Illusion", was a success. She indicated that her designs are inspired by Ludwig Wittgenstein's concept on seeing with different perceptions, using the ambiguous image of a "duckrabbit". She spoke of the concept behind her jewelry designs, "It's something that I like to remind myself of, that there are many situations in life that aren't worth splitting hairs over, and if I simply adjust the angle that I'm viewing things from, I can easily see a different perspective." In early 2016, Kate founded her own fine jewelry brand and online shop; katetsui.com

Further education
Between the years of 2015–2016, Kate completed her Jewelry Design course at GIA and Colored Gem Professional Level II at the Gübelin Academy.

In June 2019, Kate received her master's degree in Psychology at the University of Hong Kong.  She had plans to further her studies overseas and pursue a Ph.D. in psychology and Philosophy.

Filmography

Films

Television

Awards
2016
The most promising new entrepreneur of the year - katetsui.com

2015
Jade Solid Gold Music Awards Presentation 2014 – Song Award: 棋逢敵手 (with Hubert Wu)

2014
StarHub TVB Awards 2014 – My Top 6 Favourite Female TV Character Award (Bounty Lady)
StarHub TVB Awards 2014 – Everlasting Glow Award
Jade Solid Gold Second Round Music Awards 2014  – Song Award: 棋逢敵手 (with Hubert Wu)

2013
StarHub TVB Awards 2013– My Top 6 Favourite Female TV Character Award (Highs and Lows) 
StarHub TVB Awards 2013 – Most Glamorous Female Artist Award
 Next TV Awards 2013 – Top 10 Artist (No. 10)

2012
TVB 45th Anniversary Awards 2012 – My Favourite Female Character Award (Highs and Lows)
StarHub TVB Awards 2012 – My Top 6 Favourite Female TV Character Award (Lives of Omission)
StarHub TVB Awards 2012 – Star of Perfect Poise Award
My AOD Awards 2012 – My Top 15 Favourite Characters Award (Highs and Lows)

2011
StarHub TVB Awards 2011 – My Favourite Female TV Character (When Lanes Merge)
StarHub TVB Awards 2011 – Most Energetic Award
My AOD Awards 2011 – My Top 15 Favourite Characters Award (Forensic Heroes III)

2010
2009 Ultimate Song Chart Awards (903) – Female Newcomer – Silver 
2009 Jade Solid Gold Best Ten Music Awards Presentation – Best Newcomer Artist – Gold 
2009 RTHK Top 10 Gold Songs Awards – Best Prospective Newcomer Award – Gold
Sina Music Awards 2009 – My Favourite Female Newcomer 2009 – Bronze
 Sprite Music Award Ceremony 2009 – Most Outstanding Newcomer Award (Hong Kong Region)
IFPI Hong Kong CD Sales Presentation 2009 – Top Selling Hong Kong Female Newcomer

2009
Jade Solid Gold First Round Music Awards 2009 – Newcomer Impact Award
JSG Third Round Music Awards 2009 – Song Award: Hit Me
Metro Radio Hits Music Award Presentation 2009 – Metro Radio Hits King of New Singers Award 2009 (Female)

2008
27th Hong Kong Film Awards – Best New Performer Award

2007
TVB 40th Anniversary Awards 2007 – Most Improved Female Artist Award
Hong Kong Film Directors' Guild 2007 – Best Newcomer – Gold Award

2005
Miss Chinese International 2005 – Miss Gorgeous

2004
Miss Hong Kong 2004 – Winner 
Miss Hong Kong 2004 – Miss Photogenic
Miss Hong Kong 2004 – Miss International Goodwill
Miss Hong Kong 2004 – Slimming Beauty Award

Discography

Albums

Songs

References

External links
Official TVB Blog of Kate Tsui

|-
!colspan="3" style="background: #DAA520;" | Miss Hong Kong
|-

|-
!colspan="3" style="background: #DAA520;" | TVB Anniversary Awards
|-

|-
!colspan="3" style="background: #DAA520;" | Hong Kong Film Awards
|-

|-
!colspan="3" style="background: #DAA520;" | Metro Radio Hit Music Awards

|-
!colspan="3" style="background: #DAA520;" | Commercial Radio Song Awards

|-
!colspan="3" style="background: #DAA520;" | Jade Solid Gold Best Ten Music Awards Presentation

|-
!colspan="3" style="background: #DAA520;" | RTHK Top 10 Gold Songs Awards

1979 births
Living people
21st-century Hong Kong women singers
Hong Kong film actresses
Hong Kong television actresses
Miss Hong Kong winners
TVB actors
University of California, Davis alumni
Hong Kong people of Hakka descent
People from Boluo
21st-century Hong Kong actresses
Hakka musicians